The 1986/87 FIS Nordic Combined World Cup was the fourth World Cup season, a combination of ski jumping and cross-country skiing organized by International Ski Federation. It started on 13 Dec 1986 in Calgary, Alberta, Canada and ended on 19 March 1987 in Oslo, Norway.

Calendar

Men

Standings

Overall 

Standings after 9 events.

Nations Cup 

Standings after 9 events.

References

External links 
FIS Nordic Combined World Cup 1986/87 

1986 in Nordic combined
1987 in Nordic combined
FIS Nordic Combined World Cup